Blood and Honor is a fantasy novel by Graeme Davis, set in the world of Eberron, and based on the Dungeons & Dragons role-playing game. It is the fourth novel in "The War-Torn" series. It was published in paperback in September 2006.

Plot summary
Blood and Honor is a novel in which a disgraced exile aims to save a noble house in the nation of Karrnath.

Reception
Pat Ferrara of mania.com comments: "Blood and Honor is the first novel by British native Graeme Davis. D&D fans have no fear though, Davis has been writing for Game Workshop's White Dwarf magazine since 1982, has written over 30 books and 100 articles for Dungeons & Dragons and other roleplaying games, and has been intimately involved in the design of more than 15 computer and video games."

References

2006 American novels

Eberron novels